Jean Byron (born Imogene Audette Burkhart; December 10, 1925February 3, 2006) was an American film, television, and stage actress. She is best known for the role of Natalie Lane, Patty Lane's mother in The Patty Duke Show. She was also known as Jean Audette and Jean Burkhart early in her career.

Early life
Byron was born in Paducah, Kentucky, the daughter of Mr. and Mrs. Edward Burkhart. Her family moved to Louisville when she was still quite young, and then to California when she was 19 during World War II. 

As a teenager, Byron tap danced and performed comedy. In the summer of 1939, she sang with a production company at the Iroquois Amphitheater in Louisville.

Career 
Byron sang on radio stations WGRC and WHAS, both in Louisville. In 1939, she was one of two winners of the regional Gateway to Hollywood competition in Louisville, which enabled her to go to Hollywood to compete at the program's next level. Byron sang on alternate days on Kentucky Karnival, a program that originated at WGRC beginning on August 30, 1943, and was distributed nationally via the Mutual Broadcasting System.

She also sang with Tommy Dorsey's band, followed by a stint with Jan Savitt's group. She then studied drama from 1947 to 1950, followed by a run with the Players Ring, but offered the performers needed exposure. There, in a play titled Merrily We Roll Along, she came to the attention of Harry Sauber, talent adviser for Sam Katzman. She was asked to read from the script and imitate a British accent, which she did. She got her union card then and there. When asked her name, she replied Imogene Burkhart. Katzman rejected that name, so she volunteered the stage name, Jean Byron, which she had already been using and which the Columbia Pictures brass found more palatable.

Byron's first film was Voodoo Tiger (1952). In the 1950s, Byron appeared in several B-movies, including The Magnetic Monster and Serpent of the Nile, in addition to guest roles on The Millionaire, The Pepsi-Cola Playhouse, Science Fiction Theatre, Fury, Bourbon Street Beat, and The Cheyenne Show. Byron also served as spokeswoman for Revlon and Lux products on NBC's The Rosemary Clooney Show. She played Minnie in the syndicated TV series Mayor of the Town (1954).

In 1959, Byron landed a semiregular spot on CBS's The Many Loves of Dobie Gillis playing Dr. Imogene Burkhart, her real name. During her time on the show, she was cast in a spinoff pilot about Dobie Gillis' girlfriend, Zelda, where she would have played the girl's mother. However, the pilot was not picked up. In the show's final season, Byron convinced producers to allow her character to discard the plain, repressed appearance she presented, and show a more modern version of a schoolteacher.

The following year, she starred in the short-lived soap opera Full Circle.  In 1963, she won the role of Natalie Lane on The Patty Duke Show. After the series ended in 1966, she continued appearing in guest roles on Batman, Marcus Welby, M.D., Maude, and Hotel. She also was a regular on Pat Paulsen's Half a Comedy Hour (1970).

In addition to film and television roles, Byron worked in regional theater. She portrayed Mama Rose in Gypsy and appeared in a production of Guys and Dolls.

Personal life and death
Byron was married to actor Michael Ansara from 1955 to 1956. Some sources have it as 1949 to 1956.  The couple had no children and Byron never remarried.

On February 3, 2006, Byron died in Mobile, Alabama, of complications following hip replacement surgery.

Filmography

References

Bibliography

External links
The Official Jean Byron Site

American film actresses
American stage actresses
American television actresses
People from Paducah, Kentucky
Actresses from Louisville, Kentucky
1925 births
2006 deaths
20th-century American actresses
21st-century American women